The .475 Nitro Express is a British rifle cartridge developed in the early 20th century.

Design
The .475 Nitro Express is a slightly tapered, non-bottlenecked rimmed cartridge very similar in appearance to the .450 Nitro Express, that is designed for use in single-shot and double rifles.

History
It is believed the .475 Nitro Express was introduced around 1900, well before the British Army 1907 ban of .450 caliber ammunition into India and the Sudan which saw the development of the ballistically very similar .500/465 Nitro Express, .470 Nitro Express, .475 No 2 Nitro Express, and .476 Nitro Express.

Firearms historians remain unclear who developed the .475 Nitro Express, it is likely that a combination of companies going out of business and merging, along with records being lost or destroyed during the London blitz will mean the origins of this cartridge will never be known.

The .475 Nitro Express has never enjoyed the success of any of the cartridges listed above, largely because it was never adopted by any of the major rifle manufacturers. Due to this, rifles in this calibre have always been rare, generally from lesser known makers such as W.W. Greener, Army & Navy and Manton of Calcutta.

Use
The .475 Nitro Express is considered a good large-bore round, suitable for all big game, its power is very similar to the .470 Nitro Express. Ballistically it is almost identical to the .450 Nitro Express, with a larger diameter bullet; whether this is an advantage remains in dispute.

See also
Nitro Express
List of rifle cartridges
13 mm caliber

References

Footnotes

Bibliography
 Barnes, Frank C, Cartridges of the World, ed 13, Gun Digest Books, Iola, 2012, .
 Kynoch Ammunition, "Big Game Cartridges", www.kynochammunition.co.uk, archived, 18 January 2017.
 Wieland, Terry, "Nitro Express: The Big Bang of the Big Bang", ezine.nitroexpress.info/NickuduFiles/, retrieved 31 December 2014.
 Wieland, Terry, "The .475 Nitro Express: A mysterious and under-rated orphan", ezine.nitroexpress.info/NickuduFiles/, retrieved 22 November 2016.

External links
 ".475 Nitro Express (")", www.cartridgecollector.net, retrieved 16 December 2016.

Pistol and rifle cartridges
British firearm cartridges